Tsukada may refer to
Tsukada (surname)
Tsukada davidiifolia - An Eocene plant genus with one species
8156 Tsukada, a minor planet
Tsukada Station, a railway station in Funabashi, Chiba Prefecture, Japan